Saudi Arabian cuisine (Arabic:  المطبخ العربي السعودي) encompasses the cuisines and foods of Saudi Arabia. In spite of the existence of many common dishes, Saudi Arabian dishes vary between regions as the culture itself varies.

Traditional cuisine

Foods and dishes 

Some of the common food items in Saudi Arabian cuisine include wheat, rice, lamb, chicken, yogurt, potatoes, seafood and dates.

Some additional foods and dishes include:
 Hininy 
 Madfoon 
 Mandi 
 [Jareesh] 
 Kabsa 
 [Mitazeez] 
 Markook 
 Aseedah 
 [Mutabbaq] 
 Sambosah 
 Saleeg 
 Dates mohalla
 Mabshoor 
 Manthoo 
 Roz bukhari 
 Kanafeh 
 Muhallebi 
 Basbousa 
 Umm Ali

Beverages 

Traditional coffeehouses (maqha) used to be ubiquitous, but are now being displaced by food-hall-style cafes. According to the Saudi Arabian Cultural Mission, "serving Gahwah (Coffee) in Saudi Arabia is a sign of hospitality and generosity". Traditionally, the coffee beans were roasted, cooled and ground in front of the guests using a mortar and pestle. The host would then add cardamom pods to the coffee beans during the grinding process. Once the coffee was brewed, it would be poured for the guests. Today, though, gahwah is not prepared in front of the guests; instead it is elegantly served in a dallah and poured into small cups called finjan.

Yoghurt is normally made into a drink called laban

Sobia is a cold drink usually made in the Hijaz but now available all over Saudi Arabia, especially during Ramadan. It is made from a light fermented mixture of barley/brown bread, date palm sap, herbs and spices. It may be either white or colored depending on the flavor.

Fast-food and chain restaurants 
Chain restaurants have been slow to gain ground in Saudi Arabia, yet are steadily becoming a part of the local cuisine. Although chain restaurants only account for 25% of sales in the service industry, chains have seen far more growth than independent players in recent years. Al Baik, a chain focused on the sale of broasted fried chicken, has led the charge as far as Saudi-owned chains go, and has expanded operations into several neighboring gulf states.

Islamic dietary laws 
Islamic dietary laws forbid the eating of pork and the drinking of alcoholic beverages. This law is enforced throughout Saudi Arabia. According to Islamic law, animals must be butchered in a halal way and blessed before they can be eaten.

According to the Saudi Arabian cultural mission, "guests are served hot coffee and dates as a symbol of generosity and hospitality. The same practice is carried out in the month of Ramadan. Muslims in Saudi Arabia break their fast with dates, water and Arabian coffee. The caffeine in the coffee and the carbohydrates and iron in dates nourishes the fasting person with a lot of energy. This helps them perform the Tarawih held in the evenings during Ramadan."

See also 

 Arab cuisine

References

Further reading 
 Davies, Catriona. "Saudi foodies ditch fast food for fine dining." CNN. Wednesday March 28, 2012.

External links 
 Saudi Cooking

Saudi Arabian cuisine
Arab cuisine
Middle Eastern cuisine